Samuel Ernest Hodgetts (28 October 1877 – 1944) was a British gymnast who competed in the 1908, 1912 and 1920 Summer Olympics. He was born in Birmingham, West Midlands.

In 1908 he participated in the individual all-around competition and finished eighth.

He was part of the British team, which won the bronze medal in the gymnastics men's team, European system event in 1912. In the individual all-around competition he finished 25th.

As a member of the British team in 1920 he finished fifth in the team, European system competition.

References

External links
Samuel Hodgetts' profile at databaseOlympics
Samuel Hodgetts' profile at Sports Reference.com

1877 births
1944 deaths
Sportspeople from Birmingham, West Midlands
British male artistic gymnasts
Gymnasts at the 1908 Summer Olympics
Gymnasts at the 1912 Summer Olympics
Gymnasts at the 1920 Summer Olympics
Olympic gymnasts of Great Britain
Olympic bronze medallists for Great Britain
Olympic medalists in gymnastics
Medalists at the 1912 Summer Olympics
20th-century British people